Gottfried Hensel (1687–1765) was a German linguist, working in comparative linguistics.

He worked as rector in Hirschberg (Jelenia Góra), Lower Silesia.

Hensel is best known for his work Synopsis Universae Philologiae.

References 

1687 births
1765 deaths
18th-century linguists
Linguists from Germany
German educational theorists
18th-century Latin-language writers